Miika Wiikman (born October 17, 1984) is a Swedish-born Finnish professional ice hockey goaltender. He is currently a free agent having last played for Anglet Hormadi Élite of the Ligue Magnus.

Playing career
Wiikman started his junior career in Sweden with HV71 before moving to HPK in Finland, with whom he won the SM-liiga championship in 2006 and was a recipient of the Jari Kurri trophy as the Playoff MVP. He signed an AHL contract with the Hartford Wolf Pack on June 4, 2007.

Miika started the 2007–08 season splitting playing time with Al Montoya.  After the latter's trade to the Phoenix Coyotes organization, Wiikman became Hartford's primary goaltender, finishing the season with a 21-8-3 record, during which he was awarded Player of the Week on January 27, 2008. On April 24, 2008, he signed an NHL entry-level contract with the Rangers.

He opened the 2009–10 season again with Hartford before he was reassigned to the Charlotte Checkers of the ECHL. On March 3, 2010, Wiikman was traded by the Rangers to the Phoenix Coyotes for Anders Eriksson. He was then assigned to AHL affiliate, the San Antonio Rampage for the remainder of the season.

On April 26, 2010, Wiikman returned to the Finland's SM-liiga, signing a one-year contract with Lukko for the 2010-11 season.

On the June 21, 2015, Wiikman continued his journeyman career in moving to England, to play for the Nottingham Panthers of the Elite ice hockey league. Wiikman departed Nottingham in April 2017, following two years with the team.

In September 2017, Wiikman signed with EIHL new-boys Milton Keynes Lightning as short-term injury cover following an injury to their number one netminder in pre-season.

In August 2018, Wiikman signed for fellow EIHL side Coventry Blaze after it was confirmed that incumbent netminder Kevin Nastiuk was not returning to the club.

Wiikman, a dual citizen, has played on the Finnish national team and the Swedish national junior team.

Career statistics

Awards
2002-03 J20 SuperElit SM-silver Medal
2003-04 Finland2 (Mestis) Rookie of the Year
2005-06 Jari Kurri trophy - awarded to the best player in the Finnish SM-liiga playoffs.
2005-06 SM-liiga Champion

References

External links

1984 births
Living people
Anglet Hormadi Élite players
HC '05 Banská Bystrica players
Charlotte Checkers (1993–2010) players
Coventry Blaze players
Finnish ice hockey goaltenders
Hartford Wolf Pack players
HDD Olimpija Ljubljana players
HPK players
Ilves players
Jokerit players
Kiekko-Vantaa players
Kokkolan Hermes players
Lukko players
Milton Keynes Lightning players
Nottingham Panthers players
Oulun Kärpät players
People from Mariestad Municipality
SaiPa players
San Antonio Rampage players
Swedish ice hockey goaltenders
TuTo players
Sportspeople from Västra Götaland County
Swedish expatriate sportspeople in France
Swedish expatriate sportspeople in Slovakia
Swedish expatriate sportspeople in England
Finnish expatriate ice hockey players in Slovakia
Finnish expatriate ice hockey players in the United States
Finnish expatriate ice hockey players in France
Finnish expatriate ice hockey players in England
Swedish expatriate ice hockey players in the United States